The Hungarian People's Army or the HPA was the military of the Hungarian People's Republic and the armed branch of the Hungarian Socialist Workers' Party from 1951 to 1990. It only saw combat in a foreign country once during its existence, which was assisting the Soviet Union in crushing the Prague Spring. It maintained close ties to the Warsaw Pact along with other Eastern Bloc countries. It dissolved in 1989 and retained its current form through the Hungarian Defence Force.

History

Early years 
Soviet influence over the Hungarian armed forces began to rapidly increase starting in November 1948, "..when hundreds of Soviet military "advisers" were assigned to the Hungarian army from the top all the way down to the regimental level. Although theoretically acting only as advisers, they influenced all important decisions. Beginning in December 1948, thousands of Hungarians began attending Soviet military and political academies to gain technical expertise and political indoctrination. Hungarian generals were sent to Soviet general staff schools."

After the 1948 creation of the HPA the allies and the Soviet Union permitted it to have a 65,000 strong Army and an Air Force with 5,000 personnel and 90 aircraft. The first Minister of Defence Mihály Farkas completely based the HPA off Stalinism until the death of Joseph Stalin in 1953. The HPA mimicked the Soviet Army's Political commissar model, In which party members could teach the ideas of Marxism–Leninism to soldiers of the HPA. After Stalin's death, de-Stalinization swept through the HPA quickly leading to the resignation of Farkas as Minister of Defence.

1956 Revolution and aftermath 

During the Hungarian Revolution of 1956, the People's Army was deployed at a minimum. During this period, the Soviet Army invaded Hungary due to the revolution which was taking place. As a result, the Soviets took away most of the HPA's equipment, and dismantled the Air Force. In 1959 they began rebuilding the HPA and the new Hungarian leader János Kádár, asked for 200,000 Soviet troops from the Southern Group of Forces to stay in the country, which led to the government to rely more on the Soviets leading to the deterioration of the HPA.

Role in the invasion of Czechoslovakia 

In 1968, the Soviet Union and four other member states of the Warsaw Pact, building on the doctrine of “limited sovereignty”, invaded Czechoslovakia in gross violation of the principle of non-interference in internal affairs (Article 2(7), Chapter I of the United Nations Charter). Bypassing the Parliament, the Hungarian party and the government decided to take part. The designated troops were largely those of 8th Motor Rifle Division. The Hungarian military units were ordered on July 27, 1968, at 3 o'clock in the morning, to be fully operational and to carry out the mobilization of the reservists. The troops occupied Aszód and Rétság on 28 July, and their prepared waiting areas in the area between, and were prepared to carry out the task here. Out of the mobilised Hungarian personnel, four were killed in accidents.

The Danube Flotilla was incorporated into the Ground Forces in 1968.

Reorganization and modernization 
In the late 1970s, the top political leadership demanded that the military leadership propose an organizational structure better suited to the size, geographical location, position in the Warsaw Pact, and changes in armaments and technology. The aim was to create an army that was better suited to the size and military geographical position of Hungary smaller than the existing one, and with less but more modern equipment. At the end of 1984, General Lajos Czinege was retired. The plans, drawn up in consultation with the Commander-in-Chief of the Joint Armed Forces, provided for substantial changes in both forces, the implementation of which would begin in 1985. This was the so-called "RUBIN task", which was in all respects a modernization and reorganization policy that aimed to:

 continue the Hungarian commitments to the Warsaw Pact
 provide the HPA with modern and advanced equipment
 adapt the military doctrinal practices to the changing times

This policy eliminated the division level organization in both forces, and thus, four corps were created, three land forces and one for domestic air defence, replacing eight divisions.

The Air Defence and Aviation Command was established to provide domestic air defence. On the basis of the disbanded 1st Home Air Defence Army Command and the two Air Force Divisions, the 1st Hungarian Air Defence Corps Command was established in Veszprém, incorporating the newly formed brigades of Hungarian Air Defence (air-missile and radio-technical units). As a result of the replacement of reconnaissance aircraft with more modern ones, an independent squadron was organised on the basis of personnel of the 101st reconnaissance aircraft regiment. Transport and combat helicopters were organised into regiment-level units.

For ground troops, although the army corps command level (5th Army Command) and army corps direct-reporting troops remained unchanged, an entirely new structure emerged with the abolition of divisions and many of the regiments and the introduction of NATO styled brigade organizations, a first in the Warsaw Pact. This meant that the 1st Mechanized Corps was set up in Tata and the 2nd Mechanized Corps in Kaposvár. The 3rd Corps, which had been independent in Cegléd until then, was subordinated to the 5th Army Command. Each land forces corps, by 1988, included five brigades (infantry and armored) organized into a brigade HQ and the combat, combat support and service battalions and/or companies under the brigade framework. 

In 1981 Danube Flotilla received six AM type modern minesweepers, and by 1988 it consisted of 700 men and eighty-two vessels, including ten Nestin MSI (riverine) boats. During wartime its chief functions would have been to clear the Danube River and Tisza River of mines, and, in addition, to assist the Hungarian Ground Forces and other Warsaw Pact armies to successfully transport their men and its materiel across rivers.

End of the HPA 
Soviet troops relaxed their control during the era of Mikhail Gorbachev, and Hungary later became a Democratic Republic. As it moved on from socialism the HPA was converted into the new model, officially dissolving the HPA and becoming the new Hungarian Defence Force.

Structure 

The HPA included the Hungarian Ground Forces and the Air and Air Defence Forces. In the early 1980s, it was estimated that the ground forces accounted for 90 percent of the HPA. By 1 July 1986, the International Institute for Strategic Studies estimated that the Ground Forces and the Danube Flotilla had 83,000 personnel (including 50,000 conscripts), and the Air Forces 22,000 (including 8,000 conscripts) for a total of 105,000 personnel. Four years later, a less precise 1989 manpower estimate was approximately 100,000, of which about 64,000 were conscripts. 

In 1963 the Ground Forces were organised into:
 5th Army at Székesfehérvár
 7th Motor Rifle Division at Kiskunfélegyháza
 8th Motor Rifle Division at Zalaegerszeg
 9th Motor Rifle Division at Kaposvár
 11th Tank Division at Tata
 34th Special Reconnaissance Battalion at Székesfehérvár
 3rd Army Corps at Cegléd
 4th Motor Rifle Division at Gyöngyös
 15th Motor Rifle Division at Nyíregyháza

Tactical Aviation Command at Veszprém (later relocated to Börgönd)
 101st Reconnaissance Regiment at Szolnok (relocated to Taszár in 1984 as a reconnaissance squadron)
 87th Attack Helicopter Regiment at Szentkirályszabadja (upgraded to brigade in 1987)
 89th Composite Air Transport Regiment at Szolnok (formed in 1984 as the 101st Reconnaissance regiment vacated the air base)
 90th Command Support and Courier Helicopter Regiment at Börgönd
 93rd Composite Air Squadron at Tököl

1st Homeland Air Defence Army Command at Veszprém
 1st Air Defence Division at Veszprém
 47th Fighter Regiment at Pápa
 31st Fighter Regiment at Taszár
 11th Air-defence Artillery Brigade at Budapest, after 1977 Érd
 104th Air-defence Artillery Regiment Nagytarcsa after Szabadszállás
 45th Radiotechnical Warning Regiment at Taszár
 2nd Air Defence Division at Miskolc
 59th Fighter Regiment at Kecskemét
 105th Air-defence Artillery Regiment at Miskolc
 54th Radiotechnical Warning Regiment at Kecskemét

The 1st Homeland Air Defence Army and its two constituent air defence divisions were merged in 1984 into the 1st Homeland Air Defence Corps. It took over the three fighter air regiments, the air defence brigade and the two air defence regiments and the 54th and 45th radar regiments merged into the 54th Radiotechnical Brigade. All the homeland air defence units carried the 'Honi' [Homeland] prefix in their official designations.

HPA security forces 
In the early 1980s, there were also four separate internal security forces under the Ministry of Interior. These included the Internal Security Troops (Belső Karahatalom); the State Security Authority (Államvédelmi Hatóság, ÁVH)'s Security Police, the Frontier Guard or Border Guard (Határőrseg, HO), wearing army uniforms, 15,000 strong; and the Workers' Militia (Munkás Őrseg, MŐ). By mid-1986 it was estimated that the Frontier Guards were 16,000 strong, with 11,000 conscripts, divided into 11 districts.

Equipment 
Hungary had the smallest number of aircraft and least equipment in the Warsaw Pact.

In the 1950s the Army was equipped with T-34/85 tanks, as well as 68 IS-2s, which were in service between 1950-1956. After the crackdown of the Hungarian Revolution of 1956 all were returned to the Soviet Union.

The Army had 1,200 T-54 and T-55 tanks in 1988. It also had about 100 Soviet made T-72's in its inventory. The HPA's artillery included 225 M-1938 122 mm and 50 M-1943 or D-1 howitzers. It also included 90 2S1 122mm and 20 2S3 152mm self-propelled guns.

Military conscription 

Most conscripts were poorly trained, and therefore they were used as a labor force. All of the conscripts had to go through a few weeks of rifle training before they go into workers branches.  During the conscription period opinion towards the HPA became very negative and it caused many young men to make excuses on why they should not be drafted (mainly fake medical excuses).

References

 (Library of Congress Country Studies)

External links
The 7015th Ceremonial Regiment of the Hungarian People's Army
Hungarian Border Guards
An HPA military parade in Budapest in 1957
Tisztavatás on Kossuth Square (20 August 1987)
Soviet Nuclear Weapons in Hungary 1961-1991

Hungarian People's Republic
1951 establishments in Hungary
1990 disestablishments in Hungary
Warsaw Pact
Military units and formations of the Cold War